The fourth season of Esta historia me suena (shown on screen as Esta historia me suena: Vol. 4) aired from 26 July 2021 to 3 September 2021 on Las Estrellas. The season is produced by Genoveva Martínez and Televisa. The season will consist of thirty one-hour episodes. The episodes are named after songs from the 1990s.

This is the first season not to be presented by the singer María José. The series theme song is now performed by musical group JNS.

Notable guest stars 

 Scarlet Ortiz
 Pedro Sicard
 Raquel Bigorra
 Abraham Ramos
 Isaura Espinoza
 Lisset
 Wendy González
 Paty Díaz
 Alfredo Gatica
 Jorge Muñiz
 Sachi Tamashiro
 Alejandra Procuna
 Lisardo
 Eugenio Cobo
 Miguel Garza
 Christian de la Campa
 Anna Ciocchetti
 Alicia Machado
 Jorge Aravena
 Eugenia Cauduro
 Ariel López Padilla
 Daniela Aedo
 Sandra Itzel
 Tiaré Scanda
 Pablo Valentín
 Alejandra Bogue
 Omar Fierro 
 Andrea Noli
 Raquel Olmedo
 Cecilia Gabriela
 Ricardo Franco
 Luis Bayardo
 Mar Contreras
 Gabriela Roel
 Gabriela Spanic
 Fran Meric

Episodes

Notes

References 

2021 Mexican television seasons